Huron North was a federal electoral district represented in the House of Commons of Canada from 1867 to 1882, and from 1917 to 1953. It was located in the province of Ontario. It was created by the British North America Act of 1867 which divided the County of Huron into two ridings: Huron North and Huron South.

The North Riding consisted of the Townships of Ashfield, Wawanosh, Turnberry, Howick, Morris, Grey, Colborne, Hullett, and the Village of Clinton and McKillop.

In 1872, the County of Huron was divided into three ridings when Huron Centre was created. The townships of Grey, Colborne, Hullett, and the Village of Clinton and McKillop, were transferred from Huron North to the new riding.

The electoral district was abolished in 1882 when it was redistributed between the newly created Huron East and Huron West ridings.

In 1914, Huron North was re-created from Huron East and Huron West when Huron county was again divided into two ridings. The new riding consisted of the townships of Wawanosh East, Wawanosh West, Colborne, Ashfield, Turnberry, Morris, Howick, and Grey, the towns of Goderich and Wingham, and the villages of Blyth, Brussels and Wroxeter.

In 1924, it was redefined to consist of the part of the county of Huron lying north of and including the town of Goderich and the townships of Colborne, Wawanosh (East and West), Morris and Grey.

In 1934, it was redefined to consist of the townships of Goderich, Colborne, Ashfield, Wawanosh (East and West), Morris, Grey, Turnberry and Howick, and the town of Clinton in the county of Huron.

The electoral district was abolished in 1952 when it was redistributed between Huron and Wellington—Huron ridings.

Members of Parliament

This riding elected the following members of the House of Commons of Canada:

Election results

1867–1882

|}

|}

|}

1917–1953

|}

|}

|}

|}

On Mr. King's death, 14 January 1927:

|}

|}

|}

|}

|}

|}

See also 

 List of Canadian federal electoral districts
 Past Canadian electoral districts

References

External links 
Riding history 1867 to 1882 from the Library of Parliament
Riding history 1917 to 1953 from the Library of Parliament

Former federal electoral districts of Ontario